Earth A.D./Wolfs Blood is the second album released by American punk rock band Misfits. It is the last album the group recorded with founding member Glenn Danzig on vocals, who issued the vinyl record on his Plan 9 label in December 1983, two months after he played his last concert with the band. The iTunes version of the album includes the Die, Die My Darling EP and is titled Earth A.D. / Die, Die, My Darling.

The original nine-song album was later issued with the three tracks from the band's 1984 single incorporated into the track listing: "Die, Die My Darling", "Mommy, Can I Go Out and Kill Tonight?" and "We Bite".

Glenn Danzig has said that the tracks "Bloodfeast" and "Death Comes Ripping" were originally intended for release on the first album by his subsequent band, Samhain, but were added to what would be the Misfits' final record in a last-ditch effort to save the band.

Tributes 
Metallica covered "Die, Die My Darling" for their 1998 cover album Garage Inc., as well as "Green Hell", which they originally covered for their 1987 album, The $5.98 E.P. - Garage Days Re-Revisited, as part of a medley with "Last Caress". British extreme metal band Cradle of Filth covered "Death Comes Ripping" for their 1999 release From the Cradle to Enslave. Swedish black metal band Marduk did a cover of "Earth A.D." on their EP Obedience.

In July 2015, the Jerry Only-led incarnation of the Misfits played the album in its entirety at the annual This is Hardcore festival.

On August 1, 2018, action figure company Super7 released an Earth A.D.-themed "Fiend" figure as part of their ReAction Misfits figure collection.

Track listing

Personnel 
 Glenn Danzig – vocals
 Doyle – guitars
 Jerry Only – bass
 Robo – drums
 Arthur Googy - drums on "Die, Die My Darling"
 Spot – producer

References 

Misfits (band) albums
1983 albums
Albums produced by Spot (producer)
Plan 9 Records albums